Evstati Stratev was a Bulgarian stage and film actor born in 1934, deceased in 1984.

He is best known for the colourful supporting characters that he portrayed in the Bulgarian cinema, until his untimely death in 1984, most notably the village school teacher in The Hare Census (1973), the fellow countryman in A Peasant on a Bicycle (1974) and the correspondence student in Villa Zone (1975).

Selected filmography

References

Sources

External links

Bulgarian male film actors
Bulgarian male stage actors
Bulgarian male television actors
People from Shumen
1934 births
1984 deaths
20th-century Bulgarian male actors